Millstream Falls National Park is located just west of Ravenshoe, Queensland along the Kennedy Highway in Far North Queensland, Australia, 1,341 km northwest of Brisbane.  Big Millstream Falls is reputedly the widest single-drop falls in Australia.  The park is small, at only .

See also

 Millstream Falls
 Protected areas of Queensland

References

National parks of Far North Queensland